Hanuman Tok is a Hindu temple complex which is located in the upper reaches of Gangtok, the capital of the Indian state of Sikkim. The temple is dedicated to lord Hanuman, and maintained by the Indian army. It was established in 1952.

Legends
According to the local legends, when Hanuman was flying to Dunagiri (mountain) which had the life saving herb Sanjeevani to save Lord Rama's brother Lakshmana, he rested in the spot for some time where his temple now lies.

References

Note
Hanuman Tok or Hanuman Temple is also one of the prominent temples located in the capital city of Sikkim. The tranquility and serenity around the temple are so mesmerizing that it will attract you to spend some time         here. There is one more Hanuman Temple in the city which is built by the Indian Army. The scenic beauty surrounding the Hanuman Tok Temple is mesmerizing for the visitors. Hinduism followers, as well as the other tourists who visit Gangtok, have to visit this place to view the enchanting natural beauty and feel the serenity surrounds the temple.

LOCATION

_

1. The temple is located around 11 km from the main city of Gangtok on the branch road of the Gangtok-Nathula Highway at the height of 7200 feet from the sea level. The legend of this temple says that Lord Hanuman rested here for a while during his return trip to Lanka from the Himalayas carrying the Sanjeevani herbs to cure Lord Lakshman. The temple is famously known as the wish-fulfilling temple.

Hanuman temples
1952 establishments in Sikkim
Gangtok
Hindu temples in Sikkim
20th-century Hindu temples
Tourist attractions in Sikkim
20th-century architecture in India